On 5 November 2019, the BBC published a list of novels selected by a panel of six writers and critics, who had been asked to choose 100 English language novels "that have had an impact on their lives". The resulting list of "100 novels that shaped our world", called the "100 'most inspiring' novels" by BBC News, was published by the BBC to kick off a year of celebrating literature.

The list triggered comments from critics and other news agencies.
News agencies from outside the United Kingdom, like Canadian broadcaster CBC News and Nigerian news website Legit.ng, profiled authors with works included in the list who were nationals of their countries. The Guardian noted surprising titles missing from the list, like Moby-Dick, and writing in The Daily Telegraph, Jake Kerridge called it "a short-sighted list that will please nobody."

The BBC relied on six experts: Stig Abell, Mariella Frostrup, Juno Dawson, Kit de Waal, Alexander McCall Smith and Syima Aslam.  The CBC characterized the panel as composed of "writers, curators and critics".  According to The Guardian, the list commemorated the publication of Robinson Crusoe, 300 years earlier – "widely seen as the progenitor of the English-language novel".

The panel broke their list into ten categories of ten novels each.

See also 
Criticism of the BBC
Classical Literature
Old English literature
Medieval Literature
Renaissance Literature

References

Top book lists
Lists of novels
BBC-related lists
Literary criticism